Mereb Estifanos (born 1975) is an Eritrean actress

Biography
Estifanos was born in 1983 in Arareb, in the former province of Sahel (now part of the Northern Red Sea Region). She is the daughter of Estifanos Derar and Negesti Wolde-Mariam, both of whom were Eritrean People's Liberation Front militants. Estifanos attended high school in Asmara. She described herself as a studious and quiet child, eager to get high marks in school. Estifanos played volleyball in high school, but quit playing the sport to focus on acting.

Although initially aspiring to be a dancer or singer, in 2002 Fessehaye Lemlem, screenwriter for the film Fermeley, approached Estifanos to act in his film. She was in grade 11 at the time and had no acting experience. After some initial hesitation, including trying to figure out if he was conning her, Estifanos signed the contract to appear in the film. She played a university student who fell in love with another student, although their romance ended in tragedy. Following her role in the film, Estifanos decided to give up her studies to focus on acting, though she made a resolution that if she was in any way dissatisfied with her acting she would return to her studies.

Estifanos took a three-month course on acting from the Department of Cultural Affairs. She described her ideal role as that of a lover, though she usually played the part of a popular girl, and she cited Helen Meles as an influence. Estifanos played Feruz in the TV serial Hareg, a girl with two lovers. She has performed in several other popular films, including Werasi Kidan, Gezie, Mezgeb, Shalom, Azmarino, Ketali Sehbet, and Fekri Tsa’iru. As of 2014, Estifanos took part in 75 short and feature films.

Partial filmography
2002: Fermeley
2012: Tigisti
2016: Zeyregefet Embaba
2010: Timali

References

External links
Mereb Estifanos at the Internet Movie Database

1983 births
Living people
Eritrean actresses
People from Northern Red Sea Region